The 1995 Newsweek Champions Cup and the State Farm Evert Cup were tennis tournaments played on outdoor hard courts. It was the 22nd edition of the Indian Wells Masters and was part of the Championship Series, Single Week of the 1995 ATP Tour and of Tier II of the 1995 WTA Tour. They were held at the Grand Champions Resort in Indian Wells, California, in the United States, with the men's tournament played from March 6 through March 13, 1995, while the women's tournament took place from February 27 through March 5, 1995.

Finals

Men's singles

 Pete Sampras defeated  Andre Agassi 7–5, 6–3, 7–5
 It was Sampras' 1st title of the year and the 33rd of his career.

Women's singles

 Mary Joe Fernández defeated  Natasha Zvereva 6–4, 6–3
 It was Fernández's 1st title of the year and the 14th of her career.

Men's doubles

 Tommy Ho /  Brett Steven defeated  Gary Muller /   Piet Norval 6–4, 7–6
 It was Ho's 1st title of the year and the 2nd of his career. It was Steven's only title of the year and the 5th of his career.

Women's doubles

 Lindsay Davenport /  Lisa Raymond defeated  Larisa Neiland /  Arantxa Sánchez Vicario 2–6, 6–4, 6–3
 It was Davenport's 2nd title of the year and the 7th of her career. It was Raymond's only title of the year and the 3rd of her career.

See also
 Agassi–Sampras rivalry

References

External links
 
 Association of Tennis Professionals (ATP) tournament profile
 WTA tournament profile

Newsweek Champions Cup
State Farm Evert Cup
Indian Wells Masters
Newsweek Champions Cup and the State Farm Evert Cup
Newsweek Champions Cup and the State Farm Evert Cup
Newsweek Champions Cup and the State Farm Evert Cup
Newsweek Champions Cup and the State Farm Evert Cup